The World According to Gessle is the third solo album by Swedish pop singer Per Gessle, released on 2 May 1997. It was his first solo album in English. The title is a paraphrase of "The World According to Garp" - the novel by John Irving. The album topped the Swedish Album Chart.

"Do You Wanna Be My Baby?", "Kix" and "I Want You to Know" were released as singles. The videos for the singles were all directed by Jonas Åkerlund. At the end of the "Lay Down Your Arms" track, there is a hidden track. The track, an alternate version of "Kix" is called Cha-cha-cha, sung like Elvis Presley. The Japanese release of this album features the ballad "Love doesn't live here", the song was also recorded by Belinda Carlisle, featured on her album A Woman and a Man.

Gessle used Brainpool and Gyllene Tider as backing musicians for the album.

Re-releases
The World According to Gessle was re-released on 22 2003 as a low budget edition in a cardboard sleeve, and again re-released on 14 May 2008 as an anniversary edition. This time it was a double CD, with 26 bonus tracks.

Track listing 
Original release

2008 remastered re-release

Charts

Credits
 Per Gessle - Words & Music, Vocals, Electric & Acoustic guitars, Harmonica, Tambourine, Vox Jaguar
 Christoffer Lundquist - Bass guitar, Zither, Flute, Electric guitar, Backing vocals, Minimoog
 Clarence Öfwerman - Piano, Mellotron, Vox jaguar, Organ, Synthesizers, Vocoder, Acoustic guitar, Backing vocals
 Michael Ilbert - Programming & percussion
 Mats M.P Persson - Electric & acoustic guitars
 Anders Herrlin - Bass guitar
 Micke "Syd" Andersson - Drums & percussion
 Jonas Isacsson - Electric guitars & E-bow
 Marie Fredriksson - Additional vocals on "I'll Be Alright"
 Micke "Nord" Andersson - Acoustic guitars
 David Birde - Electric & acoustic guitars
 Christer Jansson - Drums & percussion
 Jens Jansson - Drums & percussion
 Jalle Lorensson - Harmonica
 Pelle Siren - Acoustic guitar
 Jackie Öfwerman - Additional vocals on "Elvis in Germany"
 Erik Hausler - Baritone saxophone
 Wojtek Goral - Tenor saxophone
 Strings by S.N.Y.K.O - Conducted by Mats Holmquist. Arranged by Gessle, Ilbert & Öfwerman

References

External links
 Per interviewing himself about the album

1997 albums
2008 albums
Per Gessle albums